The 1969 Japan Series was the 20th edition of Nippon Professional Baseball's postseason championship series. It matched the Central League champion Yomiuri Giants against the Pacific League champion Hankyu Braves. This was the third consecutive meeting between the two teams in the Japan Series, with the previous two matchups being won by the Giants. Yomiuri defeated Hankyu once again in six games to capture their fifth consecutive championship.

Summary

See also
1969 World Series

References

Japan Series
Orix Buffaloes
Yomiuri Giants
Japan Series
Japan Series
Japan Series
Japan Series